The Tinius Trust manages the largest block of shares in Schibsted Media Group (26,1%) through the company Blommenholm Industrier. The trust was established by Tinius Nagell-Erichsen. According to its Articles of Association, the Trust must ensure a long-term, healthy financial development of Schibsted, and protect the conditions for editorial independence, credibility and quality in all publications owned by the Group. Kjersti Løken Stavrum is the CEO of the Tinius Trust and Blommenholm Industier. Ole Jacob Sunde is chairman of the board.

Board of Trustees 
The board of trustees consists of three persons, each with their self-appointed deputy member.

 Ole Jacob Sunde (chairman)
 John A. Rein
 Kjersti Løken Stavrum

Their deputy members are:
Karl Christian Agerup, CEO of Oslo Tech
Jon Wessel-Aas, Lawyer in Bing Hodneland
Gunilla Asker, SVP Marketing at ICA Sweden AB

References

External links
Official website
Schibsted's info on the trust
Nieman Lab: The Tinius Trust has published its annual study on the state of digital news

Organisations based in Oslo
Mass media companies of Norway
Foundations based in Norway
Organizations established in 1996
1996 establishments in Norway